Tushilovka is a rural locality (a selo) in Kizlyarsky District, Republic of Dagestan, Russia. The population was 716 as of 2010. There are 4 streets.

Geography 
Tushilovka is located 74 km northeast of Kizlyar (the district's administrative centre) by road. Bryansk and Koktyubey are the nearest rural localities.

Nationalities 
Russians, Avars, Dargins and Tabasarans live there.

References 

Rural localities in Kizlyarsky District